Galoot is a 2003 Israeli documentary that explores the Israeli–Palestinian conflict from the perspective of Palestinian refugees and new immigrants to Israel. It includes scenes in London, Israel, Morocco and Poland. The film stars Dr Tim Hunt, 2001 Nobel Prize in Medicine.

References

2003 films
Israeli documentary films
Documentary films about the Israeli–Palestinian conflict